Ahmed Al-Kassar (Arabic:أحمد الكسار) is a Saudi Arabian footballer who plays as a goalkeeper for Saudi Arabian club Al-Faisaly.

Club career

Al-Raed
On 19 June 2009, Al-Raed signed with Ahmed Al-Kassar from Al-Taraji for 1.8 million Saudi Riyals. He left in 2015 to go to Al-Ettifaq.

Al-Ettifaq
On 10 September 2015, Al-Ettifaq signed with Ahmed from Al-Raed. He won the Saudi First Division in his first season. On 18 August 2017, Ahmed Al-Kassar made a last-minute assist for Hazaa Al-Hazaa to make  Al-Ettifaq draw 2–2 against Al-Nassr, and he became the fifth goalkeeper to make an assist in the Saudi Professional League. He commented after the match saying that manager Miodrag Ješić didn't want him to go forward but he ignored him and made the assist.

Career statistics

Club

Honours

Clubs
Al-Ettifaq
Saudi First Division: 2015–16

Al-Faisaly
King Cup: 2020–21

Individual
 Saudi Professional League Goalkeeper of the Month: November 2021

References

Living people
1991 births
People from Qatif
Association football goalkeepers
Saudi Arabian footballers
Saudi Arabia youth international footballers
Al-Taraji Club players
Al-Raed FC players
Ettifaq FC players
Al-Faisaly FC players
Saudi First Division League players
Saudi Professional League players